The men's 200 metre breaststroke event at the 1960 Olympic Games took place between August 26 and August 30.

Medalists

Results

Heats

Six heats were held; the swimmers with the sixteen fastest times advanced to the Semifinals.  Because there were three swimmers with a time of 2:42.4, a swim-off was held to determine the two that would advance.

Key

Heat One

Heat Two

Heat Three

Heat Four

Heat Five

Heat Six

Swim-Off

Semifinals

Two heats were held; the fastest eight swimmers advanced to the Finals.  Those that advanced are highlighted.

Semifinal One

Semifinal Two

Final

References

Men's breaststroke 200 metre
Men's events at the 1960 Summer Olympics